Rhynchospora rubra is a member of the sedge family, Cyperaceae. It found throughout southeast Asia, Oceania, and western and southern Africa. 

Rhynchospora rubra grows between 25 to 100 centimeters tall. It features a distinctive spherical spikelet at the end of its stem, a trait it shares with Rhynchospora holoschoenoides, but can be distinguished by the absence of spikelets on multiple branches, as R. rubra possesses only a single spikelet on its central stem.

References

External links

rubra
Flora of West Tropical Africa
Flora of Southern Africa
Flora of Madagascar
Flora of Southeast Asia
Flora of Oceania
Plants described in 1790
Plants described in 1903